Elie Ofek is an Israeli-American economist currently at Harvard Business School.

Published works
Ofek has more than 290 publications, with an h-index of 50.

(Partial List)

Books
 Elie Ofek, Barak Libai, Eitan Muller, Innovation Equity: Assessing and Managing the Monetary Value of New Products and Services, University of Chicago Press, 2016  
Harvard Business School Cases:
 Elie Ofek, Barak Libai, Eitan Muller, Customer Lifetime Social Value (CLSV), 2021
 Elie Ofek, Barak Libai, Eitan Muller, Customer Management Dynamics and Cohort Analysis, 2020
 Elie Ofek, Barak Libai, Eitan Muller, Ride-Hailing Services: Forecasting Uber's Growth, 2019

Selected articles

  Taylan Yalcin, Elie Ofek, Oded Koenigsberg, Eyal Biyalogorsky, Complementary Goods: Creating, Capturing And Competing For Value, Marketing Science, 32, 2013, pp. 554-569 
 Oded Koenigsberg, Eyal Biyalogorsky, Elie Ofek, Taylan Yalcin, Executive Summary: Never Mind the Complements, Where's the Value?, Business Strategy Review, 24, 2013

References

External links 
 
 

Year of birth missing (living people)
Living people
Harvard Business School faculty
American economists
Stanford University alumni
Tel Aviv University alumni